Predrag Mijić (born 4 June 1970) is a politician in Serbia. He was the mayor of Čoka, Vojvodina, from 2004 to 2011 and served in the Assembly of Vojvodina from 2008 to 2016. Mijić is a member of the Democratic Party (Demokratska stranka, DS).

Private career
Mijić is a veterinarian.

Politician

Mayor of Čoka
Serbia introduced the direct election of mayors in the 2004 Serbian local elections, and Mijić was elected as mayor of Čoka in the second round of voting. At the time of the election, Čoka did not have a local newspaper, television station, or radio station; Mijić indicated in 2006 that his administration planned to set up local media ventures. The Čokanske hronike journal was launched during his tenure.

Mijić appeared in the 131st position on the DS's electoral list in the 2007 Serbian parliamentary election. The list was sixty-four mandates, and he was not included in his party's delegation. (From 2000 to 2011, mandates in Serbian parliamentary elections were awarded to sponsoring parties or coalitions rather than to individual candidates, and it was common practice for the mandates to be distributed out of numerical order. Mijić could have been awarded a mandate despite his low position on the list, although this ultimately did not happen.)

The direct elections of mayors was abolished with the 2008 local electoral cycle. The Democratic Party won a plurality victory in this election and formed a new government with the Hungarian Coalition; Mijić was appointed to a second term as mayor. In early 2011, he gave an extended interview on the municipality's challenges, including a regional trend of population decline.

Assembly of Vojvodina
Mijić was elected to the Vojvodina provincial assembly for the Čoka division in the 2008 provincial election. The DS and its allies won a majority victory, and Mijić served as a supporter of the administration. Following a change to Serbia's conflict-of-interest rules in 2011, he was advised that he could not continue his dual mandate as both mayor and a provincial representative; he resigned as mayor shortly thereafter. In the same year, Serbia changed its electoral laws such that mandates in elections held under proportional representation would be awarded to candidates on successful lists in numerical order.

He was re-elected for the Čoka constituency seat in the 2012 provincial election. The DS again led Vojvodina's provincial administration after the election, and Mijić served on the government side. He was also elected to the Čoka municipal assembly in the concurrent 2012 Serbian local elections.

For the 2016 provincial election, Vojvodina adopted a system of full proportional representation. Mijić appeared in the fifty-third position on the DS"s electoral list and was not re-elected when the list won only ten mandates. He was also a (largely nominal) candidate for the DS in Čoka in the 2016 local elections, appearing in the twenty-fourth list position out of twenty-five. The list won three mandates, and he was not returned.

Electoral record

Provincial (Vojvodina)

Municipal (Čoka)

References

1970 births
Living people
People from Čoka
Mayors of places in Serbia
Members of the Assembly of Vojvodina
Democratic Party (Serbia) politicians